Fairview is a census-designated place in Mecklenburg County, Virginia, just north of Chase City.Some of the community is considered North Chase City. The population as of the 2010 census was 240.

References

Census-designated places in Mecklenburg County, Virginia
Census-designated places in Virginia